Chen Youding (1330–1368), was a Yuan dynasty military leader who quelled various uprisings at the end of Yuan dynasty (including the Ispah rebellion). He was finally promoted to the highest official in Fujian because of his military leadership and talent.

Name 
He was also called 陈有定 which is also spelled Chen Youding. He was given the name Guo An 国安 or An Guo 安国 meaning 'peaceful country'. He was also called Yongqing (永卿).

Birthplace 
He was a native of Yujian, Fuqing County (福清县玉涧), Fuzhou, Fujian at the end of Yuan dynasty. When he was a teenager, he moved to Qingliu County, Tingzhou Prefecture to work as a farmer, and then joined the Yuan dynasty government army. He was described as a tall, brave and strong man.

Career 
After Yuan dynasty General Chen Youding crushed the Ispah Rebellion, he continued to rule over the Fujian even after the outbreak of the Red Turban Rebellion. Eventually, forces loyal to Ming dynasty founder Zhu Yuanzhang (Hongwu Emperor) took over Fujian in 1367. During the Yuan-Ming transition, he was executed by Zhu Yuanzhang.

Influence and contributions 
Chen Youding was a Han Chinese general who joined the Yuan dynasty. He was also one of the rare talented military generals in the Mongol-led Yuan government and armies at that time. These characteristics made him famous in the history of China. The Yuan Shi 《元史》wrote about him in the 'Biography of Loyalty and Righteousness' (《忠义传》). Jie Jin (解縉) of the Ming dynasty praised him for "always doing his best" (「始終盡節」), and Wang Pei also praised him as one of the three loyal leaders in Fujian (福建三忠之一).

References 

Yuan dynasty generals
Generals from Fujian
People from Fujian
1330 births
1368 deaths